Pupatonia gracilispira is a species of marine gastropod mollusc in the family Eatoniellidae. First described by Baden Powell in 1933 as Estea gracilispira, it is endemic to the waters of New Zealand.

Description
Powell described the species as follows:

Pupatonia gracilispira measures 1.1mm, by 0.525mm. The species is similar in appearance to Pupatonia mimitula, but differs by having a narrower spire, and by having a smooth and polished texture.

Distribution

The species is endemic to New Zealand. The holotype and four paratypes were collected by either Powell himself or by C. A. Fleming in February 1933, from a depth of 18 metres off Owenga Beach in the Chatham Islands. The species has almost exclusively been identified in the Chatham Islands, however has also been identified at Waipapa Point in the south of the South Island, and the Auckland Islands.

References

Eatoniellidae
Fauna of the Chatham Islands
Gastropods described in 1933
Gastropods of New Zealand
Endemic fauna of New Zealand
Endemic molluscs of New Zealand
Molluscs of the Pacific Ocean
Taxa named by Arthur William Baden Powell